Harry "Herbie" Lowenthal (12 August 1876 – 1 February 1960) was an Australian rules footballer who played with Carlton in the Victorian Football League (VFL).

Notes

External links 

Herbie Lowenthal's profile at Blueseum

1876 births
1960 deaths
Australian rules footballers from Victoria (Australia)
Carlton Football Club players